Teghut Mine is a closed copper and molybdenum open-pit mine in Armenia's northern province of Lori in the village of Teghut with deposits valued at US$15.5 billion (in 2010).  In December 2014, Vallex Group launched production operations at the mine, which is a US$380 million project.  In February 2018 Vallex Group published a statement announcing suspension of all operations and laying off nearly all staff.

The mine was expected become comparable in size to the Kajaran Mine in southern Armenia.

Available deposits and value 
The Teghut forest lies atop ore deposits containing an estimated 1.6 million tons of copper and about 100,000 tons of molybdenum.  In 2010, with the price of copper at US$7,500 per ton and molybdenum at US$35,000 per ton, this amounts to about US$12 billion in copper and US$3.5 billion in molybdenum.  Therefore, the total value of the mine's deposits was about $15.5 billion in 2010.

Mine financing and ownership 
Vallex, which is run and at least partly owned by Russian-Armenian businessman Valeri Mejlumyan, claims to have already invested almost $340 million in Teghut. It has borrowed the bulk of that money from VTB, a leading Russian bank.

In 2013, the company also attracted $62 million in funding from a Danish pension fund which was due to be partly or fully channeled into purchases of metallurgical equipment from another Danish company, FLSmidth. In 2017, the Danish state credit agency decided to withdraw export credit guarantees to mine operators, accusing its private owner of failing to comply with environmental standards.

Notable incidents, statements and events

Assessments before opening 
Pre-project reports indicated that open-pit mining at Teghut will lead to the destruction of 357 hectares of rich forest, including 128,000 trees. Environmentalists claimed that ore crushing and enrichment will also pollute a local river and underground waters.

2014 - Statements by the mine operator 
Vallex claimed to have created about 1,300 new jobs and pledged to build new schools and upgrade infrastructure in nearby villages.

The company said that it planned to manufacture $182 million worth of non-ferrous ore concentrates there in 2015.

2017 August - Mine operator acknowledges environmental pollution 
At public hearings, Vallex Deputy Director General Sahak Karapetyan didn't reject the fact of environmental pollution and promised to find a solution.

2017 October - Funding withdrawal due to environmental issues 
After a series of warnings, the Danish state agency EKF decided to withdraw export credit guarantees to mine operators, accusing its private owner of failing to comply with agreed environmental standards.

2017 December - Discontent of community residents 
Community residents formally demanded that the Ministry of Nature Protection cancels the mine expansion project.

2018 January - Leak into river 
By the end of January 2018 reports were published that the mine's tailings dam had cracks, and that unprocessed mine waste leaked into Shnogh River, making it become visibly polluted. However minister for nature protection maintains there measurements could not determine any river pollution.

2018 February - Vallex Group declared suspension of all operations 
The mine operator issued a statement declaring it will suspend all operations and lay off all workers except for few responsible for preservation of existing infrastructure.

Gallery

Panoramas from September 2013

See also

Mineral industry of Armenia

References

External links
 Teghout CJSC, official website of Vallex Mining subsidiary.
 Save Teghut Civic Initiative, an independent and voluntary network of free and concerned people from Armenia, Diaspora and various parts of the world who believe and fight for healthy and dignified human livelihood. The initiative was founded in 2007.
 Teghut: Bread of the Children, a 2009 documentary film (35 minutes) about the Teghut mine project
 Mining in Armenia, a 10-minute documentary, produced by Robert Davidian and Liana Hakobyan.
 Թեղուտ․ բնապահպանական, տնտեսական և իրավական կոլապս, (Teghut: Environmental, Economic and Legal Collapse), a 14-minute update by CivilNet (March 14, 2018) (in Armenian).
 Serj Tankian in defense of Teghut Forest (2012).  Famous Armenian-American rock band vocalist Serj Tankian speaks out against mining in Armenia, specifically against mining at Teghut.

Copper mines in Armenia
Molybdenum mines in Armenia
Surface mines in Armenia